The 1901 Colorado Silver and Gold football team was an American football team that represented the University of Colorado as a member of the Colorado Football Association (CFA) during the 1901 college football season. Fred Folsom returned from a one-year absence for his sixth season as head coach and led Colorado to an overall record of 5–1–1 with a mark of 2–0 in conference play, winning the CFA championship.

Schedule

References

Colorado
Colorado Buffaloes football seasons
Colorado Football Association football champion seasons
Colorado Silver and Gold football